Tri Lilije Hall is a multi-purpose sports venue located in Laško, Slovenia. The capacity of the arena is 2,500 for basketball matches.

References

Sports venues completed in 1995
1995 establishments in Slovenia
Indoor arenas in Slovenia